The 1997 Purefoods Corned Beef Cowboys season was the 10th season of the franchise in the Philippine Basketball Association (PBA). The team was known as Purefoods Carne Norte Beefies in the Governor's Cup.

Draft pick

All-Filipino Cup title
The Purefoods Corned Beef Cowboys won the All-Filipino Cup title at the expense of Gordon's Gin Boars. Coach Eric Altamirano, who replaces Chot Reyes at the start of the season, became the youngest coach to steer his team to a PBA crown.

Runner-up finish
In the Governors Cup, Purefoods advances into the championship series for the second time in the season by winning their best-of-five semifinal series against San Miguel Beermen, three games to two. 

Going up against the defending champion Alaska Milkmen in the finals, the Carne Norte Beefies won Game one, but lost the last four games to settled for a second place finish in the season-ending conference.

Occurrences
On July 21, pre-season acquisition Cris Bolado was traded to Gordon's Gin in exchange for Edward Joseph Feihl, who hold out of his contract with the Boars, Feihl began playing for Purefoods in the Governors Cup. 

Two imports by the same name of Mike Jones played for Purefoods in the season, the first one was a third round pick of the Milwaukee Bucks in the 1988 NBA draft and who played in the Commissioners Cup, replacing their former import Ronnie Grandison, who return to the team he played with back in 1993 but couldn't lead the Cowboys to victories this time. 

The other Mike Jones was from Rutgers University, who played in the Governors Cup finals and he started out with the Beefies in their fourth outing in the Governors Cup after temporary import Eric Brown fill in for Jones in the first three games.

Award
Alvin Patrimonio won his fourth Most Valuable Player (MVP) trophy, tying the record of Ramon Fernandez' four MVPs.

Roster

Transactions

Trades

Additions

Recruited imports

References

Magnolia Hotshots seasons
Purefoods